Dean Marney may refer to:
Dean Marney (author) (born 1952), children's book author
Dean Marney (footballer) (born 1984), English footballer